Alex Trezza (born September 1, 1980) is an American college baseball coach and former catcher. He played college baseball at Stony Brook University. He served as head baseball coach of the LIU Brooklyn Blackbirds baseball team from 2015 to 2016.

Trezza played catcher at Stony Brook for three years, and in the 2001 season was among national leaders in offensive categories including home runs and RBI.  He then played professionally for twelve seasons, reaching Class A+ in the Detroit Tigers organization.

He began his coaching career at Anna Maria, where he served as an assistant for one season before moving to Adelphi for one season.  Next, he served as assistant coach and recruiting coordinator at New Haven.  He then earned his first NCAA Division I job at Sacred Heart, where he served for one season before earning his first head coaching position at LIU Brooklyn in 2015.

On July 19, 2016, Trezza left LIU Brooklyn to join the Boston College Eagles baseball team staff. Trezza left the Eagles after the 2021 season.

Head coaching record

References

External links

1980 births
Living people
Adelphi Panthers baseball coaches
Anna Maria Amcats baseball coaches
Baseball catchers
LIU Brooklyn Blackbirds baseball coaches
New Haven Chargers baseball coaches
Sportspeople from Brooklyn
Baseball players from New York City
Sacred Heart Pioneers baseball coaches
Stony Brook Seawolves baseball players
Boston College Eagles baseball coaches